The 1st Gemini Awards were held in Toronto on 4 December 1986 to honour achievements in Canadian television. Gémeaux Award, the French version of the Gemini Awards were held for the first time this year as well. The 1985 television miniseries Anne of Green Gables was the most prominent winner.

English-language television coverage of the ceremonies was originally scheduled for broadcast on CBC Television, but labour disruptions at that network forced the telecast to move to a syndicated arrangement of private television stations including Toronto's Citytv. Unused cable channels in Montreal carried the broadcast in that city. The inaugural Gemini Awards were hosted by Second City Television performers Eugene Levy, Andrea Martin and Dave Thomas from the Metro Toronto Convention Centre.

Awards

Best Comedy Program or Series
 Seeing Things
 Four on the Floor
 Hangin' In

Best Documentary, Single Program or Series
 Glenn Gould: A Portrait, Parts 1 and 2
 444 Days to Freedom: What Really Happened in Iran
 Karsh: The Searching Eye
 Making Overtures: The Story of a Community Orchestra

Best Dramatic Series
 Night Heat
 The Campbells
 Danger Bay

Best Dramatic Mini Series
 Anne of Green Gables
 Red Serge
 Spearfield's Daughter

Best TV Movie
 Love and Larceny
 The Execution of Raymond Graham
 Tramp at the Door

Best Short Drama
Oakmount High
The Exile
In This Corner
Undertow

Best Information Program or Series
 The Fifth Estate
 Canada AM
 The Journal
 Live It Up!
 Peter Ustinov's Russia

Best Children's Series
 Fraggle Rock
 OWL/TV
 Today's Special
 Wonderstruck

Best Writing in a Dramatic Program
 Donald Brittain and Richard Nielsen, Canada's Sweetheart: The Saga of Hal C. Banks
 Tim Dunphy and Peter Mohan, Night Heat
 Yan Moore, The Kids of Degrassi Street (episode "Griff Gets a Hand")
 Judith Thompson, Turning to Stone
 Pete White, Striker's Mountain

Best Writing in a Comedy or Variety Program or Series
 Seeing Things
 The Bestest Present
 The Canadian Conspiracy
 Toller Cranston's True Gift of Christmas

Best Direction in a Dramatic Series
 Donald Brittain, Canada's Sweetheart: The Saga of Hal C. Banks
 Mario Azzopardi, Night Heat
 Allan Kroeker, Tramp at the Door
 Kevin Sullivan, Anne of Green Gables
 Marc Voizard, Blue Line

Best Direction in a Comedy or Variety Program or Series
 Robert Boyd, The Canadian Conspiracy
 David Acomba, Toller Cranston's True Gift of Christmas
 Ron Meraska, The S and M Comic Book
 Peter Thurling, Floating Over Canada
 Eric Till, Fraggle Rock: "The Perfect Blue Rollie"

Best Direction in a Documentary Program or Series
 Larry Weinstein, Making Overtures: The Story of a Community Orchestra
 Les Harris, 444 Days to Freedom: What Really Happened in Iran

Best Performance by a Lead Actor in a Continuing Role in a Comedy Series
 Louis Del Grande, Seeing Things
 Don Adams, Check it Out
 David Eisner, Hangin' In

Best Performance by a Lead Actor in a Continuing Dramatic Series
 Robert Clothier, The Beachcombers
 Scott Hylands, Night Heat
 Malcolm Stoddard, The Campbells
 Jeff Wincott, Night Heat

Best Performance by a Lead Actor in a Single Dramatic Program or Miniseries
 August Schellenberg, The Prodigal
 Maury Chaykin, Canada's Sweetheart: The Saga of Hal C. Banks
 Jeff Fahey, The Execution of Raymond Graham
 Ed McNamara, The Prodigal
 Ed McNamara, Tramp at the Door

Best Performance by a Lead Actress in a Continuing Role in a Comedy Series
 Martha Gibson, Seeing Things
 Lally Cadeau, Hangin' In
 Janet-Laine Green, Seeing Things

Best Performance by a Lead Actress in a Continuing Dramatic Series
 Marnie McPhail, The Edison Twins
 Jennifer Dale, Night Heat
 Susan Walden, Danger Bay

Best Performance by a Lead Actress in a Single Dramatic Program or Miniseries
Megan Follows, Anne of Green Gables
Kim Braden, Spearfield's Daughter
Nicky Guadagni, Turning to Stone
Elizabeth Shepherd, The Cuckoo Bird

Best Performance by a Supporting Actor
Richard Farnsworth, Anne of Green Gables
Bernard Behrens, Turning to Stone
Thomas Peacocke, Oakmount High
Douglas Rain, Love and Larceny
R. H. Thomson, Canada's Sweetheart: The Saga of Hal C. Banks

Best Performance by a Supporting Actress
Colleen Dewhurst, Anne of Green Gables
Anne Anglin, Turning to Stone
Sharry Flett, The Suicide Murders
Jackie Richardson, Turning to Stone

Best Performance by a Broadcast Journalist
 Eric Malling, The Fifth Estate
 Jim Reed, W-FIVE
 Joe Schlesinger, The National

Best Performance by a Host or Interviewer
 David Suzuki, The Nature of Things
 Linda MacLennan, Canada AM
 Bill Paul, Marketplace
 Valerie Pringle, Midday
 Peter Ustinov, Peter Ustinov's Russia

TV Guide's Most Popular Program Award
 Anne of Green Gables

Earle Grey Award
 Ed McNamara

References

01
Gemini Awards, 1986
Gemini Awards, 1986